Charles Sylvain Rabotoarison (born 6 April 1944 in Vohipeno, died 2 July 2020) was a Malagasy politician. He was a member of the Senate of Madagascar for Vatovavy Fitovinany. He was former Minister of the Interior and Ministry of Environment, Water and Forestry.

References

1944 births
2020 deaths
Members of the Senate (Madagascar)
People from Vatovavy-Fitovinany